This article is a list of Serie C champions and promotions since its establishment – including the competition under previous names.

Seconda Divisione
Parentheses denote other teams promoted.
 1926–27 – Monza, (Carrarese), (Ponziana), (Terni)
 1927–28 – Edera Trieste, (Rivarolese), (Saronno), (Viareggio), (Seregno), (Forlì)
 1928–29 – Vogherese, Vigevanesi, Pavia, Clarense, Mirandolese, Rovigo, Empoli

Prima Divisione
Parentheses denote other teams promoted.
 1929–30 – Udinese, (Libertas), (Derthona), (Palermo)
 1930–31 – Comense, Vigevanesi, Cagliari
 1931–32 – Giovanni Grion, Messina, Sampierdarenese
 1932–33 – Initially: Perugia, Foggia, Vezio Parducci Viareggio, Following expansion: Catanzarese, Seregno, SPAL, Pavia, Vicenza, Derthona
 1933–34 – Aquila, Pisa, Lucchese, Catania
 1934–35 – Taranto, Siena

Serie C (1935–78)
Parentheses denote other teams promoted.

 1935–36 – Venezia, Cremonese, Spezia, Catanzaro
 1936–37 – Padova, Vigevano, Sanremese, Anconitana, Taranto
 1937–38 – SPAL, Fanfulla Lodi, Casale, Siena, Salernitana
 1938–39 – Brescia, Catania
 1939–40 – Reggiana, Vicenza, Maceratese
 1940–41 – Prato, Fiumana
 1941–42 – Cremonese, Juventina Palermo
 1942–43 – Varese, Pro Gorizia
 1943–45 – no national competition due to World War II
 1945–46 – Mestrina, Prato, Perugia, Alba Ala Roma, Benevento, Lecce, Leone Palermo
 1946–47 – Magenta, Vita Nova P.S. Pietro, Bolzano, Centese, Nocerina
 1947–48 – competed amongst 18 regional leagues, no promotion to Serie B, no overall champions
 1948–49 – Fanfulla Lodi, Udinese, Prato, Avellino
 1949–50 – Seregno, Treviso, Anconitana, Messina
 1950–51 – Monza, Marzotto Valdagno, Piombino, Juve Stabia
 1951–52 – Cagliari
 1952–53 – Pavia, (Alessandria)
 1953–54 – Parma, (ArsenalTaranto)
 1954–55 – Bari, (Livorno)
 1955–56 – Venezia, (Sambenedettese)
 1956–57 – Prato, (Lecco)
 1957–58 – Reggiana, (Vigevano)
 1958–59 – OZO Mantova, Catanzaro
 1959–60 – Pro Patria, Prato, Foggia
 1960–61 – Modena, Lucchese, Cosenza
 1961–62 – Triestina, Cagliari, Foggia
 1962–63 – Varese, Prato, Potenza
 1963–64 – Reggiana, Livorno, Trani
 1964–65 – Novara, Pisa, Reggina
 1965–66 – Savona, Arezzo, Salernitana
 1966–67 – Monza, Perugia, Bari
 1967–68 – Como, Cesena, Ternana
 1968–69 – Piacenza, Arezzo, Casertana
 1969–70 – Novara, Massese, Casertana
 1970–71 – Reggiana, Genoa, Sorrento
 1971–72 – Lecco, Ascoli, Brindisi
 1972–73 – Parma, SPAL, Avellino
 1973–74 – Alessandria, Sambenedettese, Pescara
 1974–75 – Piacenza, Modena, Catania
 1975–76 – Monza, Rimini, Lecce
 1976–77 – Cremonese, Pistoiese, Bari
 1977–78 – Udinese, SPAL, Nocerina

Serie C1 (1978–2008)

Group A

Group B

Lega Pro Prima Divisione (2008–14)

Group  A

Group B

Serie C2 (1978–2008)

Seasons from 1978–79 to 1990–91

Seasons from 1991–92 to 2007–08

Lega Pro Seconda Divisione (2008–14)

Seasons from 2008–09 to 2010–11

Seasons from 2011–12 to 2013–14 season

Lega Pro (2014–2017)

Serie C (2017–)

References

Serie C
champions and promotions